Orangedale is a Canadian rural community located in Inverness County, Nova Scotia.

Founded by Orangemen who settled in the vicinity of the Denys Basin of Cape Breton Island's Bras d'Or Lake, Orangedale was a small farming and fishing community until 1886 when the Intercolonial Railway of Canada mainline from Sydney to Point Tupper was constructed.  Orangedale became host to a Victorian-period 2-storey wooden railway passenger station, and it became the preferred stop for many passengers heading to and from northern Cape Breton Island.

The community developed into a small railway service centre, with the majority of its residents being employed by the railway.  The ICR was absorbed into the Canadian National Railways in 1918, and in 1993 CN sold the line to Sydney to the Cape Breton and Central Nova Scotia Railway.  Passenger rail service had already stopped following the January 15, 1990 budget cuts by Via Rail Canada.

In 1988, a group of community volunteers formed to save the original ICR station from being demolished.  Today it is part of an extensive railway museum.

The Rankin Family's song "Orangedale Whistle" pays homage to the community's role in Cape Breton Island's transportation history.

In 2021, the L'Arche community donated the Boston Christmas Tree.

References

External links
 Orangedale Railway Museum - Nova Scotia Railway Heritage Society website

Communities in Inverness County, Nova Scotia
General Service Areas in Nova Scotia